Romania competed at the 2016 Winter Youth Olympics in Lillehammer, Norway from 12 to 21 February 2016.

Medalists

Medalists in mixed NOCs events

Alpine skiing

Boys

Girls

Biathlon

Boys

Girls

Mixed

Bobsleigh

Cross-country skiing

Boys

Girls

Ice hockey

Luge

Individual sleds

Mixed team relay

Skeleton

Ski jumping

Speed skating

Girls

Mixed team sprint

See also
Romania at the 2016 Summer Olympics

References

2016 in Romanian sport
Nations at the 2016 Winter Youth Olympics
Romania at the Youth Olympics